Osmium(IV) chloride or osmium tetrachloride is the inorganic compound composed of osmium and chlorine with the empirical formula OsCl4. It exists in two polymorphs (crystalline forms).  The compound is used to prepare other osmium complexes.

Preparation, structure, reactions
It was first reported in 1909 as the product of chlorination of osmium metal.
This route affords the high temperature polymorph:
Os  +  2 Cl2  →  OsCl4
This reddish-black polymorph is orthorhombic and adopts a structure in which osmium centres are octahedrally coordinated, sharing opposite edges of the OsCl6 octahedra to form a chain. A brown, apparently cubic polymorph forms upon reduction of osmium tetroxide with thionyl chloride:
OsO4 + 2 SOCl2 → OsCl4 + 2 Cl2  +  2 SO2

Osmium tetraoxide dissolves in hydrochloric acid to give the hexachloroosmate anion:
OsO4 + 10 HCl → H2OsCl6 + 2 Cl2  +  4 H2O

References

Osmium compounds
Chlorides
Platinum group halides